Philip James Dunster (born 31 March 1992) is an English actor. He is known for in the Sky One drama Strike Back (2017–2018), the Channel 4 science fiction series Humans (2018), the ITV comedy-drama The Trouble with Maggie Cole (2020), the Apple TV+ sports series Ted Lasso (2020–), and the Amazon Prime thriller The Devil's Hour (2022).

Early life
Dunster was born in Northampton. He attended Leighton Park School in Reading, where he served as Head Boy. He played rugby as a child, though he realised at the age of fifteen that he was too small after a failed tryout for London Irish. He also considered following in the footsteps of his father and brother and joining the military. He went on to train at the Bristol Old Vic Theatre School, graduating with a Bachelor of Arts in Acting in 2014.

Career
In 2015, Dunster played Claudio in the Reading Theatre production of Much Ado About Nothing, made his television debut in the Channel 4 sitcom Catastrophe, and played Dickie Baker in the low budget film The Rise of the Krays, a role he would reprise in its sequel the following year The Fall of the Krays.

Dunster starred as Arthur in Pink Mist at the Bristol Old Vic and Bush Theatre in London, for which he received an affiliate Laurence Olivier Award nomination in 2016. That same year, he appeared in The Entertainer at the Garrick Theatre and two episodes of the Sky One crime drama Stan Lee's Lucky Man.

From 2017 to 2018, Dunster was in the main cast of Strike Back as Lance Corporal Will Jensen for its sixth series, also known as Strike Back: Retribution, also on Sky One. He had recurring roles in the Sky Atlantic drama Save Me as BJ McGory and the third series of the Channel 4 science fiction series Humans as Tristan. He also appeared in the films Megan Leavey, Murder on the Orient Express, and All Is True. In 2019, he appeared in the Sky Atlantic miniseries Catherine the Great as well as the films Judy and The Good Liar.

In 2020, Dunster began starring as Jamie Tartt in the Apple TV+ sports comedy Ted Lasso. He also played Jamie Cole on the ITV comedy-drama The Trouble with Maggie Cole and appeared in the BBC One three-parter Dracula. He played Mike Stephens in the 2022 Amazon Prime thriller The Devil's Hour.

Personal life 
Dunster is a lifelong football fan, supporting AFC Wimbledon. He is currently in a relationship with filmmaker Eleanor "Ellie" Heydon.

Filmography

Film

Television

Stage

Awards and nominations

References

External links
 
 Phil Dunster at Spotlight
 

Living people
1992 births
21st-century English male actors
Actors from Northamptonshire
Alumni of Bristol Old Vic Theatre School
English male stage actors
English male film actors
English male television actors
People educated at Leighton Park School
People from Northampton